= Master recording =

Original recording of audio performance

A master recording, or simply a master, is the original recording—including post-recording mixes and production edits—of an audio performance, from which all analog and digital copies of the audio are derived. The term refers only to the recorded performance of a song; it does not cover the composition of recorded material, which is a separate copyright that belongs to the songwriter unless ownership of the copyright is transferred or sold to a separate entity.
